Manoj Tiwari is an Indian politician from Uttarakhand and a three term Member of the Uttarakhand Legislative Assembly. Manoj represented the Almora Assembly constituency in the 2nd & 3rd Uttarakhand legislative Assembly and 2022 Uttarakhand Legislative Assembly election.

Electoral performance

References

Living people
Year of birth missing (living people)
20th-century Indian politicians
Indian National Congress politicians from Uttarakhand
People from Almora district
Uttarakhand MLAs 2022–2027